Canfield is an unincorporated community in Boulder County, in the U.S. state of Colorado.

History
A post office called Canfield was established in 1878, and remained in operation until 1906. The community was named after Isaac Canfield, a businessman in the local coal mining industry.

References

Unincorporated communities in Boulder County, Colorado
Unincorporated communities in Colorado